The Pickerel River CNoR bridge is a railway bridge over the Pickerel River in northern Ontario, built by the Canada Foundry Company circa 1906 for the Canadian Northern Railway.

As of 2014, the bridge is still in use by Canadian National Railway.

References 

Canadian National Railway bridges in Ontario
Canadian Northern Railway
Bridges in Parry Sound District
Rail infrastructure in Parry Sound District